Sos Eltis is an English author. She is a fellow and tutor in English at Brasenose College, Oxford.  She is a nineteenth- and twentieth-century specialist, with a special interest in theatre.  she is also Vice-Principal of the College.

Eltis is the author of Revising Wilde: Society and Subversion in the plays of Oscar Wilde, which has been described as "a radical re-examination of the plays of Oscar Wilde", and of Acts of Desire: Women and Sex on Stage 1800-1930.

Eltis is a keen oarswoman, is a vegetarian and has two sons.

Eltis is married to the English novelist Mark Haddon, author of The Curious Incident of the Dog in the Night-Time, which is dedicated to her.

References

External links
 Dr Sos Eltis: Interviewed
 Faculty webpage
 College webpage

Living people
Fellows of Brasenose College, Oxford
Year of birth missing (living people)
British non-fiction writers
British women writers
Alumni of Christ Church, Oxford
Alumni of St John's College, Oxford